Splicer may refer to:

Splicer (BioShock), characters in the BioShock video game series
Characters in Splicers
Film splicer
Splicer (Band), a german Rock-Band